Edmund Francis O'Hearn (December 1, 1898 — April 25, 1972) was a professional football player. He played in the National Football League (NFL) in 1920 with the Cleveland Tigers and in 1921 with the New York Brickley Giants. Prior to joining the NFL, O'Hearn played college football at Boston College
His older brother, John O'Hearn, played for the NFL's Buffalo All-Americans in 1921. Both brothers played for the Tigers in 1920.

References

1898 births
Year of death unknown
American football tackles
Boston College Eagles football players
Cleveland Tigers (NFL) players
Lehigh Mountain Hawks football players
New York Brickley Giants players
Sportspeople from Brookline, Massachusetts
Players of American football from Massachusetts